Kharel is a brahmin surname found in Nepal and some parts of India.they are kumauni Brahmins.

Notable people with the surname include:
Agni Kharel, Nepalese politician 
Ramesh Kharel, Nepalese policeman
Achyut Krishna Kharel, Nepalese policeman and former IGP of Nepal
Pramod Kharel, Nepalese singer                                                                     
Rajendra Kharel, Nepalese politician
Bhanu Bhakta Kharel, Indian policeman and former SP in Sikkim Police
Saroj Kharel, Indian Stand-up Comedian

See also
AzeemKharelthok, place named after Kharels

References

Nepali-language surnames
Khas surnames